Starplex Cinemas was a Dallas-based American movie theater chain which at one point had 34 locations across the United States. Showbiz Cinemas acquired the Starplex location in Kingwood, Texas, in 2012. Later, Starplex merged with Showplex Cinemas. Starplex was among the major theatres to pull The Interview after threats were made. On July 14, 2015, it was announced that Starplex would be acquired by AMC Theatres with many operating now as AMC Classic as of mid-2017.

References

Movie theatre chains in the United States
Former cinemas in the United States
AMC Theatres
2015 mergers and acquisitions
Companies based in Dallas